Multi-track may refer to:

 Multitrack recording, the process of mixing individual sound sources to a single recording
 Multi-track diplomacy, a method of conflict resolution
 Multi track, a process of civil litigation in England and Wales
 Fast Track (disambiguation)
 Red Book (CD standard), for audio CD and DVD discs containing multiple tracks (songs)
 The BitTorrent multitracker feature, a peer-to-peer file sharing protocol used for distributing large amounts of data